George Gibson (christened 15 October 1827, died 8 October 1873) was an Australian first-class cricketer, who played three games for Tasmania over an 8-year period. He has the distinction of having participated in the first ever first-class cricket match in Australia.

He was elected unopposed to the Tasmanian House of Assembly as the member for Ringwood on 3 October 1866 and resigned in June 1869. He and his brothers were renowned sheep breeders.

Gibson died in Sandy Bay, Tasmania on 8 October 1873, aged 45.

See also
 List of Tasmanian representative cricketers

References

External links

1827 births
1873 deaths
Australian cricketers
Tasmania cricketers
Melbourne Cricket Club cricketers
Cricketers from Tasmania
Members of the Tasmanian House of Assembly